The 2012 Big South men's basketball tournament took place February 27, 29, March 1, and March 3, 2012. The semifinals were televised on ESPNU, and the championship on ESPN2. It was the first year the Big South introduced a first round that consisted of 2 games to be held on campus sites of the higher seeds. VMI and High Point defeated Radford and Gardner-Webb, respectively, to advance to the quarterfinals, held at UNC Asheville's Kimmel Arena along with the semifinals. 

The quarterfinals featured a pair of upsets, the first from the hands of VMI. The 7-seeded Keydets used a huge 2nd half run to pull away from #2 seed Coastal Carolina 85–68. Later that day, #6 Winthrop defeated #3 Campbell 71–55 thanks to 25 points from Reggie Middleton. Top-seed UNC Asheville blew away High Point 86–61, followed by Charleston Southern beating Liberty 89–72.

VMI continued their upset run with a 20-point drubbing over Winthrop 75–55. Asheville defeated Charleston Southern 91–64, thus gaining home-court advantage for the championship game on March 3. In a game that flip-flopped leads in the first half, Asheville used a 9–0 run to break a 47–47 tie with VMI and take the lead for good. After the Keydets got 2 to make the score 58–52, the Bulldogs ended the game on a 22–12 run to win the Big South crown for a second straight year.

Format
With the addition of Campbell from the Atlantic Sun, the Big South introduced a new format for 2012 where the top 10 teams in the standings qualified for the tournament. The 10-team field was the largest in the event's history, and first round games were contested for just the second time – the last occurring in 1993.

Initially, the Big South intended for only the top 10 teams to make the tournament, as Presbyterian was supposed to be complete its Division I transition this season.  However, Presbyterian was given another transition year thus, remained ineligible for the NCAA tournament and thus not allowed to participate.  As such, the ten other teams will contest the bracket.

This was the last tournament in which early-round games were held at campus sites. In June 2012, the conference announced that the 2013 men's and women's tournaments would be held solely at the Student Recreation and Convocation Center on Coastal Carolina's Conway, South Carolina campus, a venue which would ultimately open in fall 2012 as the HTC Center. With Presbyterian completing its Division I transition and Longwood joining the conference, the 2013 tournament will be the first to feature 12 teams.

Bracket

* – Denotes overtime
First round at campus sites of higher-numbered seeds
Quarterfinals and Semifinals games at #1 seed, Kimmel Arena in Asheville, NC
Championship game hosted by highest remaining seed

References

Tournament
Big South Conference men's basketball tournament
Big South Conference men's basketball tournament
Big South Conference men's basketball tournament
Big South Conference men's basketball tournament